Beth Jean Riesgraf (born August 24, 1978) is an American actress and television director. She is known for her portrayal of Parker on the TNT television series Leverage (2008–2012) and the revival Leverage: Redemption, which streams on IMDb TV/Freevee.

Early life and education
Originally from Belle Plaine, Minnesota, Riesgraf graduated from Cimarron-Memorial High School in Las Vegas, Nevada in 1996.

Career
Riesgraf appeared with then-fiancé Jason Lee as the character Natalie Duckworth on the show My Name Is Earl in 2005 and 2007, and in Alvin and The Chipmunks as a mother in the supermarket in 2007. In 2008, she played the unnamed bride in the official music video for "Cath..." by Death Cab for Cutie.

From 2008 to 2012, she played the main role of Parker in the TNT series Leverage. In 2015, Riesgraf starred in the USA Network series Complications, which follows a morally conflicted doctor's life; the show lasted for one season. In September 2019, she was cast in a starring role in the Paramount Network drama series 68 Whiskey.

Personal life
Riesgraf was in a relationship with actor Jason Lee from 2001 to 2007 and the two were engaged to be married. With Lee, she had a son born in September 2003.

Filmography

Film

Television

Director

Accolades

References

External links

1978 births
Actresses from Minnesota
Actresses from Nevada
American film actresses
American television actresses
Living people
People from Scott County, Minnesota
20th-century American actresses
21st-century American actresses